Behind the News (frequently abbreviated as BtN) is a long-running news program broadcast on Australia's ABC TV made in Adelaide and aimed at school-aged children (8–13 years of age). BtN is aimed at upper primary and lower secondary students to help them understand issues and events outside their own lives.

Behind the News explores news using the current language, music and popular culture of youths. The programme explains the basic concepts that underpin the issues and events, while also providing background information. Behind the News also covers children's issues often overlooked by mainstream news, and makes use of online resources including streaming video of BtN stories, study materials for teachers and additional information and activities for students.

History
On 5 June 1968, Behind the News aired its first episode. Originally known as Current Affairs, the name was changed to its current name within a year. The discovery of the first episode happened during the 45th anniversary (at the time, the show claimed to have started in 1969).

The ABC chose to axe Behind the News at the end of 2003 in an argument with the Government over funding, but it returned to air in 2005. While BtN was the first and original program of this nature, a similar program on Network Ten, ttn (the total news), debuted in the year BtN did not air. ttn itself was axed at the end of 2008.

In June 2014, BtN celebrated its 45th birthday, producing a short spliced clip of several decades' worth of presenters and theme songs. On 21 July 2014, BtN moved to digital channel ABC3 as part of the ABC's educational programming move.

On 2 May 2016, BtN relaunched with new graphics and a new look, also switching from using greenscreen to using the same set used on ABC3 News. The new graphics and look were teased on 1 May 2016 with the launch of BtN Newsbreak, a rebrand of ABC3 News.

According to the last episode of BtN Newsbreak for 2021, it was announced that the show would have a new look (yet to be revealed).

In 2023, BtN has officially announced BtN High, a version of BtN, but for highschool students.

BtN Newsbreak
BtN Newsbreak (previously known as ABC3 News and News On 3) is a program broadcast on ABC Me since launch, and in its current form, May 2016. They are produced by and feature the same team as Behind the News.
As with the main version of BtN, Newsbreak will also go under a large revamp.

Presenters and reporters 
Behind the News and BtN Newsbreak are presented by Amelia Moseley. BtN is produced by Sarah Larsen.

The current reporting team at Behind the News and Newsbreak includes: Jack Evans, Matthew Holbrook, Leela Varghese, Nathaniel Kelly, Cale Matthews, Charlotte Batty, Natasha Thiele, Amal Wehbe, Alexander Aarao-Ward, Michelle Waki, and Joseph Baronio.

Former reporters include Ruby Cornish, Ben Nielsen, Evelyn Manfield, Martin Dougan and Emma Davis.

See also 

 List of Australian television series
 List of longest-running Australian television series

External links
 ABC Behind the News website
 ABC3 News website

Notes 

Australian Broadcasting Corporation original programming
ABC News and Current Affairs
Australian children's television series
Black-and-white Australian television shows
Australian television news shows
Children's news shows
1968 Australian television series debuts
2003 Australian television series endings
2005 Australian television series debuts
2015 Australian television series debuts
1970s Australian television series
1980s Australian television series
1990s Australian television series
2010s Australian television series
English-language television shows
Television shows set in Adelaide
Australian television series revived after cancellation